Ignacio Toselli is an Argentine film  actor who works in the cinema of Argentina.

Filmography

 Buena Vida Delivery (2004) aka Good Life Delivery
 Cruzaron el disco (2005)
 Bonsai (2005)
 Teléfonos (2005)
 Ropa sucia (2006)
 Gotas de agua (2006)
 Una Tango (2007)
 Yo soy Sola (2008)
 Las Huellas de la Lluvia (2008)
 Liniers, la película (2010)
 El Notificador (2011)
 "Días de Vinilo" (2012)

Awards
 Festival International La Roche-sur-Yon: Best actor, for: Buena Vida Delivery; 2004.

Nominations
 Argentine Film Critics Association Awards: Silver Condor; Best New Actor, for: Buena Vida Delivery; 2005.
 Premio Estrella de Mar Best New Actor, for: "Soñar en Boedo" ; 2010.

References

External links
 
 

Argentine male film actors
Living people
Year of birth missing (living people)
Place of birth missing (living people)